Andrew Gilding (born 7 December 1970) is an English professional darts player who plays in events of the Professional Darts Corporation (PDC). He made his television debut in 2011. He won his maiden televised title at the 2023 UK Open.

Career

A former butcher and factory worker, Gilding made his television debut at the 2011 UK Open at the Reebok Stadium in Bolton as a pub qualifier. He defeated Brendan Dolan, Matt Clark, Andy Hamilton before losing 9–2 to Mark Hylton in the last 32 earning himself £2,000 in the process.

Gilding's best result of 2012 was getting to the quarter-finals at the UK Open Qualifier 7 at the NIA Community Hall, Birmingham defeating Joe Cullen, Scott Rand, Mark Hylton and Simon Whitlock before losing 6–3 to Kevin Painter. He headed into 2013 ranked world number 73. Gilding failed to qualify for the 2013 UK Open as he finished 142nd on the Order of Merit, outside of the top 96 who claimed their places. In October, he reached his first semi-final in a PDC ranking event at the tenth Players Championship of the year. Gilding saw off the likes of Dave Chisnall and 2008 BDO World Championship winner Mark Webster before losing 6–2 to five-time world champion Raymond van Barneveld. However, at the end of the year his tour card status expired and Gilding was ranked 78th in the world, outside the top 64 who remain on the tour. He entered Q School in an attempt to regain his place and was successful on the first day by beating Jamie Bain 5–0 in his last match.

2014
Gilding reached his first career PDC final at the second UK Open Qualifier, beating the likes of Raymond van Barneveld, James Wade and Phil Taylor to face reigning BDO World Champion Stephen Bunting. He lost 6–5 in a thrilling final but earned £5,000 which saw him qualify for the UK Open. He entered the tournament in the third round and received a bye as Wes Newton withdrew, before being defeated 9–4 by Kevin Painter.
He reached his second PDC final just a month later at the first Players Championship in Barnsley. He defeated Jamie Caven, Jelle Klaasen, Michael Smith, Darren Webster and James Wade before he lost 6–5 to Gary Anderson despite averaging a superb 107.70.

Gilding's performances on the Pro Tour during 2014 saw him make his debut at the World Matchplay, where he was whitewashed 10–0 by Adrian Lewis. He also played in the World Grand Prix for the first time and beat Darren Webster 2–0 (sets) in the first round. Gilding faced 11-time winner of the event Phil Taylor in the next round and won the first set, but went on to be defeated 3–1. At the Players Championship Finals he was beaten 6–3 by Mervyn King in the first round.

2015
Gilding earned £25,000 on the Pro Tour Order of Merit during 2014 to be the highest non-qualified player for the 2015 World Championship. He made his debut in the event against Robert Thornton and could only win two legs during the match in a 3–0 loss. His good year saw him start 2015 ranked world number 38, an increase of 40 places from 12 month ago. A semi-final defeat in the fourth qualifier saw Gilding enter the UK Open at the third round stage and he whitewashed Kevin Painter 9–0. Further victories over Jelle Klaasen (9–5) and James Wade (9–6) followed as he reached the quarter-finals of a major event for the first time in his career. Gilding faced Austria's Mensur Suljović and beat him 10–8 to set up a semi-final with world number one Michael van Gerwen. Gilding played the match of his career to date as he averaged 108.37, hit 10 180s and a 10 darter, but it wasn't quite enough to progress to the final as his tournament ended with a 10–8 loss. The £17,000 in prize money he earned saw him achieve his year's goal of breaking into the top 32 on the Order of Merit.

Gilding won his first match at the World Matchplay by holding on from 7–2 ahead of Mervyn King to triumph 10–8. He lost 13–7 to Peter Wright in the second round. Gilding could only win one leg in the first round of the World Grand Prix during a 2–0 set defeat against Simon Whitlock.

2016
After whitewashing Gerwyn Price 3–0 in the first round of the 2016 World Championship, Gilding lost 4–0 to Adrian Lewis picking up just two legs in the process.
He was beaten 6–5 by Ryan de Vreede in the second round of the UK Open. Gilding reached the semi-finals of the 10th Players Championship which included a 6–0 thrashing of Jelle Klaasen, but he suffered a 6–0 loss to Dave Chisnall. He qualified for the Players Championship Finals and was edged out 6–5 by Vincent van der Voort.

2017
Gilding was 2–0 down in sets to John Henderson in the opening round of the 2017 World Championship, but rallied to draw level at 2–2. He survived one match dart from Henderson in the deciding set and it would go to a sudden-death leg. Gilding won the bull to throw first and took out a 75 finish to progress. He lost all four sets by three legs to one in the second round against reigning champion Gary Anderson.

2018
Gilding missed out on 2018 PDC World Darts Championship and that sent him down the rankings. He was seeded to the second round of 2018 UK Open, but was not able to win a single leg against Gabriel Clemens, who just gained his Tour card. Throughout the year, Gilding struggled on Players Championship tournaments and he was falling out of top 64. He qualified for two European Tour events - PDC German Darts Championship (and made it to the second round) and PDC European Darts Trophy (where he lost in the first round).

In November he qualified for 2018 Grand Slam of Darts, where he finished last in his round robin group, after losing to Gerwyn Price and Simon Whitlock, his only win came in the last match against Glen Durrant. 	

After failing to qualify for the last year's tournament, Gilding secured his sport on 2018 Players Championship Finals as 43rd seed. Again he was eliminated by Gabriel Clemens in the first round.

Despite playing on two major events at the end of the year, Gilding did not qualify for 2019 PDC World Darts Championship, fell out of top 64 and lost his Tour card.

2019
Gilding went immediately to UK Q-school trying to get his Tour card back. He made it to last 16 on the third day, but failed in other three tournaments and did not retain the card. 

He started well on PDC Challenge Tour and after making it to quarterfinals and semifinals he was placed high in the rankings of this tour. That gave him a chance to be a substitute for the first two tournaments of PDPA Players Championship. Gilding made an appearance there and placed in last 16 in the first tournament. 

Gilding used his chance in European tour qualifications and qualified for three events - PDC German Darts Championship, PDC Austrian Darts Open and PDC Czech Open (where placed in last 16). Despite playing on many PDPA Players Championship tournaments throughout the year and three European Tour events, he was not able to break through into top 64 of PDC Order of Merit nor top 2 of Challenge Tour.

2020 
Gilding was not successful in UK Q-school for the second time, his best result was last 32 on the second day. 

He again started well on PDC Challenge Tour, playing the final on the second tournament. This gave him another chance on PDPA Players Championship and also on PDC Summer Series.

2021
On his third attempt to regain the Tour card, Gilding was successful via Q-school Order of Merit. He placed 2nd overall after consistent results throughout all four days of Final Stage, into which he received automatic spot after finishing in the Top 16 of the 2020 PDC Challenge Tour Order of Merit. Gilding featured in the UK Open for the first time since 2018, and was eliminated in the 3rd round.

2022

Andrew Gilding became runner up in the 2022 Belgian Darts Open on 25th of september 2022 against Dave Chisnall (6-8), which took place in the Oktoberhallen in Wieze.

2023
At the 2023 UK Open, Gilding reached a first televised final, surviving a match dart to defeat Michael van Gerwen 11–10. The £110,000 received in prize money saw him rise up to 25th in the world having been 41st prior to the weekend.

World Championship results

PDC
 2015: First round (lost to Robert Thornton 0–3)
 2016: Second round (lost to Adrian Lewis 0–4)
 2017: Second round (lost to Gary Anderson 0–4)
 2023: Second round (lost to Dave Chisnall 1–3)

Performance timeline

PDC European Tour

PDC Major finals: 1 (1 title)

References

External links

Official Website

Living people
English darts players
People from Bungay
Professional Darts Corporation current tour card holders
UK Open champions
1970 births